The 1926 North Dakota gubernatorial election was held on November 2, 1926. Incumbent Republican Arthur G. Sorlie defeated Democratic nominee David M. Holmes in a landslide victory with 81.74% of the vote.

Primary elections
Primary elections were held on June 30, 1926.

Democratic primary

Candidates
David M. Holmes, businessman

Results

Republican primary

Candidates
Arthur G. Sorlie, incumbent Governor
James M. Hanley, former North Dakota District Court Judge
J. A. McGovern

Results

General election

Candidates
Major party candidates
Arthur G. Sorlie, Republican
David M. Holmes, Democratic

Other candidates
Ralph Ingerson, Farmer–Labor

Results

References

1926
North Dakota
Gubernatorial